Aphanostola intercepta is a species of moth in the family Gelechiidae. It was described by Edward Meyrick in 1932. It is found in Bihar in eastern India.

References

Gelechiinae
Moths described in 1932
Moths of Asia